The 2018 RAN Sevens was the 19th edition of the annual rugby sevens tournament organized by Rugby Americas North. It will be played at the Barbados Polo Club in Saint James, Barbados, with the winner eligible for the 2019 Hong Kong Sevens qualifier tournament and two teams advancing to the 2019 Pan American Games.

Teams
The following fourteen teams will participate:

Pool stage
All times in Atlantic Standard Time (UTC−04:00)
Top 2 in each group advance to the knockout stage.

Pool A

Pool B

Pool C

Pool D

Knockout stage

Trophy

Pool 1

Pool 2

Placement

Plate

Cup

Standings

See also
2018 RAN Women's Sevens

References

2018
2018 rugby sevens competitions
2018 in North American rugby union
rugby union
rugby union
Qualification tournaments for the 2019 Pan American Games